Fort William Augustus (also known as Grassy Island Fort, Fort Phillips) was a British fort built on Grassy Island off of Canso, Nova Scotia during the lead up to Father Rale's War (1720).  In the wake of The Squirrel Affair and the British attack on Fort St. Louis (at present-day Guysborough), Cyprian Southack urged Governor Richard Philipps to build the fort. The Fort was named after King George's son Prince William, Duke of Cumberland.

Construction 
On 7 August 1720, 60–75 Mi'kmaq joined French fishermen from Petit de Grats and attacked Fort William Augustus (also known as Fort Phillips, after the Governor of Nova Scotia Richard Philipps) as it was being built. The Mi'kmaq killed three men, wounded four, and caused significant damage. The New Englanders took 21 prisoners which they transported to Annapolis Royal. This raid on Canso was significant because of the involvement of the Mi'kmaq and was significant in leading to Father Rale's War.

In late 1720, the New Englanders built a fort named Fort Phillips, after the Governor of Nova Scotia Richard Philipps. Construction of a permanent facility was a violation of long-standing agreements between the Mi'kmaq and the fishermen.  This significant violation helped precipitate Father Rale's War.

In 1721, the governor of Massachusetts took proprietorial attitude toward the Canso fisheries and sent  to patrol the waters off Nova Scotia. With the arrival of British troops, the Mi'kmaq were discouraged from attacking until the following year. HMS Seahorse was replaced in 1721 by a New England vessel, William Augustus under the command of Southack.

Father Rale's War 
On 23 July 1723, the village was raided again by the Mi'kmaq and they killed three men, a woman and a child. In this same year, the New Englanders built a twelve-gun blockhouse to guard the village and fishery.

In 1725, sixty Abenakis and Mi'kmaq launched another attack on Canso, destroying two houses and killing six people.

King George's War 
Edward How constructed a blockhouse and rebuilt other structures in the 1730s.  The French and Mi'kmaq destroyed the fort in the Raid on Canso during King George's War (1744). The area was used to stage of the Siege of Louisbourg (1745). A blockhouse was built, which they named Fort Prince William (Nova Scotia)

Grassy Island Fort National Historic Site of Canada
Grassy Island Fort was recognized as a National Historic Site of Canada in 1962. There are remains of the 1720 redoubt, 1723–24 fort, and the 1735 blockhouse.

See also
 Fort Lévis, a French fort renamed Fort William Augustus by the British after it surrendered in 1760.
Military history of the Acadians
Military history of Nova Scotia
Military history of the Mi’kmaq people

Citations

Sources 
Robison, Mark Power. Maritime Frontiers: The Evolution of Empire in Nova Scotia, 1713-1758. Unpublished Doctorate Thesis. Department of History. University of Colorado. 2000
Haynes, Mark. The Forgotten Battle: A History of the Acadians of Canso/ Chedabuctou. British Columbia: Trafford. 2004

External links 
 Fort William Augustus
 Parks Canada
 Canada's historic places

Military history of Acadia
Military history of Nova Scotia
Military history of New England
Military history of the Thirteen Colonies
Military forts in Nova Scotia
National Historic Sites in Nova Scotia
Acadian history
Military and war museums in Canada
Military forts in Acadia
Parks in Nova Scotia